Pieter de Villiers may refer to:

 Pieter de Villiers (athlete) (born 1982)
 Pieter de Villiers (rugby union) (born 1972)
 Peter de Villiers, South African rugby coach
 Pieter de Villiers (politician), Namibian politician and mayor of Opuwo, Kunene Region